33 Dundas Street East is a studio complex located in Downtown Toronto, Ontario, Canada. The building was acquired by Rogers Media in 2007 as the new home of its four Toronto television stations: CITY-DT (Citytv), CFMT-DT (OMNI.1), CJMT-DT (OMNI.2) and formerly CityNews Channel. CITY-DT moved into the building on September 8, 2009, followed by the Omni stations a month later on October 19. First built in 2004, the building was home to Olympic Spirit Toronto, an Olympic-themed entertainment attraction, until 2006 and before that a three-storey Salvation Army building.

The building features three floors of television studio space for Citytv and Omni.

The building is located east of Yonge Street on Dundas Square, near the Toronto Eaton Centre and 10 Dundas East (formerly Toronto Life Square). It was previously known as 35 Dundas Street East, but the street number in the address was changed to 33 in 2009.

CITY-TV's previous headquarters were located at 299 Queen Street West, which continues to serve the operations of CHUM Limited's former speciality channels, such as CP24, Much, CTV Life Channel, E!, and CTV Sci-Fi Channel, all of which now owned by Bell Media (previously CTVglobemedia). CFMT and CJMT were previously located at 545 Lake Shore Boulevard West, which continues to serve the operations of its Rogers-owned specialty channels such as OLN, The Biography Channel Canada and G4 Canada.

The Rogers Communications headquarters, where the company's other radio stations remain as well as Sportsnet and Sportsnet One, are located at the Rogers Building at One Mount Pleasant Road.

In keeping with the layout of Dundas Square, 33 Dundas Street East is notable for its large billboard, usually used to advertise Citytv and OMNI's programming, along with a Jumbotron-style TV screen which relays Citytv broadcast programming to those in the square below.

References

External links
 City
 OMNI Television

Buildings and structures completed in 2004
2004 establishments in Ontario
Buildings and structures in Toronto
Citytv
Omni Television
Television studios in Canada